The men's 100 metres event at the 2022 African Championships in Athletics was held on 8 and 9 June in Port Louis, Mauritius.

Medalists

Results

Heats
Held on 8 June

Qualification: First 2 of each heat (Q) and the next 8 fastest (q) qualified for the semifinals.

Wind:Heat 1: +2.0 m/s, Heat 2: +1.6 m/s, Heat 3: -0.1 m/s, Heat 4: +2.5 m/s, Heat 5: +0.6 m/s, Heat 6: +1.3 m/s, Heat 7: +2.9 m/s, Heat 8: +2.2 m/s

Semifinals
Held on 8 June

Qualification: First 2 of each semifinal (Q) and the next 2 fastest (q) qualified for the final.

Wind:Heat 1: +2.2 m/s, Heat 2: +1.1 m/s, Heat 3: +2.6 m/s

Final
Held on 9 June

Wind: +4.5 m/s

References

2022 African Championships in Athletics
100 metres at the African Championships in Athletics